Kiplingcotes Derby (also spelt Kipling Cotes), run at Kiplingcotes in the East Riding of Yorkshire, is widely accepted to be the oldest annual horse race in the English sporting calendar. It reputedly began in 1519 and takes place on the third Thursday in March, often in exceptionally adverse weather conditions. The 500th race took place on 21 March 2019.

One quirk of the ancient rules means that the second place rider often receives more in prize money than the winner. It is run, not over a typical modern racecourse, but partly along the wide verge of a roadside. A clerk is paid 5 shillings (25p) annually for maintaining it.

History 

Kiplingcotes is a small hamlet close to Market Weighton, in the East Riding of Yorkshire.

The race was started by the Earl of Burlington in 1519, and the first prize is the accrued interest of an original investment of 16 Guineas by the organisers, who stipulated the rules as laid down in 1618;   Women were finally allowed to compete from 1933 onwards, however, the history of the Derby states that a 60-year old woman jockey competed in 1926 riding side-saddle, being in the lead almost all the way until the last .

In 1930, the racers had to deal with  snowdrifts, and as The Times stated in case of no racers turning up to run the Derby, "..there is always some country youth keeping a watchful eye in case no entry is made by 11 o'clock. If such a thing happened, the youth would put in his entry on some old dobbin released from plough[ing] a field...." During the harsh winter of 1947, no one was daring enough to take part, and so one local farmer took it upon himself to lead a lone horse around the course, ensuring that the historic race would survive. The race normally takes 10 minutes to complete, but the farmer was contending with  snowdrifts, and so had to often dismount and clear a path, before taking his horse through. It took an hour and 20 minutes for him to complete the course.  During the 2001 UK foot-and-mouth crisis the race was once again reduced to one horse and rider. In 2018 the race was cancelled after the course was waterlogged, and again a single horse was led round the course. The 2020 event was kept going by just two riders and their horses (Ferkin and Harry) because of the COVID-19 pandemic to preserve the race.

The race is held to be the oldest Derby held in England, having started in 1519, and using the same course since 1664. The Grand National was inaugurated in 1844, and the Epsom Derby was first run in 1779.

Races

Rules 

Horses of any age can be ridden.
All those wishing to enter must gather by the starting post by 11 a.m. on the morning of the Derby.
The winner receives the sum of almost £100 (2023 total), but the rider finishing second receives the remainder of the total of the entry fees.
The rules also state that if the race is not run one year, then it must never be run again.

Notes

References

Horse races in Great Britain
Sport in the East Riding of Yorkshire
Recurring events established in 1519
1519 establishments in England